John Cusey was an American politician from Ohio. He was the first Illinois State Senator from McLean County, serving two two-year terms.

Biography
John Cusey was born in Ashland County, Ohio, on April 9, 1822. Cusey descended from an aristocratic English family. Unable to inherit the family lands, Cusey's grandfather came to the United States during the American Revolution. Cusey came with his family to McLean County, Illinois, in the fall of 1836. Cusey worked as a clerk for Jesse Funk for twenty-five years. Funk was a wealthy hog rancher, but struggled track his finances. He also made cabinets, a trade he learned from his father Job. He ran many of the county's sawmills and built several early houses.

Cusey married Hannah Bishop on November 23, 1843. A longtime abolitionist, he became involved with the Republican Party upon its formation in the 1850s. He was elected township assessor eight times. In 1865, Cusey was elected Township Supervisor and served for two years. In 1872, Cusey was elected to the Illinois Senate, the first from the county, serving for four years. Cusey became a farmer in Farmer City after retiring from the Senate. He served on the State Board of Equalization from 1880 to 1884. Cusey was active in Freemasonry and was a Methodist. He died on March 19, 1903, and was buried in Shiloh Cemetery in Heyworth, Illinois.

References

1822 births
1905 deaths
People from McLean County, Illinois
People from Ashland County, Ohio
Republican Party Illinois state senators
People from Farmer City, Illinois
19th-century American politicians